Hanna Simonsson (born 25 December 1998) is a Swedish footballer who plays for Vittsjö GIK. Simonsson grew up in Vittsjö and joined Vittsjö GIK's football academy from the age of five. She has three siblings and four half-siblings.

External links

References 

1998 births
Living people
Swedish women's footballers
Vittsjö GIK players
Damallsvenskan players
Women's association football midfielders